Aldo Buttini (6 December 1898 – 1 December 1957) was an Italian sculptor. His work was part of the sculpture event in the art competition at the 1936 Summer Olympics.

References

1898 births
1957 deaths
20th-century Italian sculptors
20th-century Italian male artists
Italian male sculptors
Olympic competitors in art competitions
People from Carrara